Ward Janssens (born 13 July 1982) is a Belgian short track speed skater. He competed in the men's 5000 metre relay event at the 2002 Winter Olympics.

References

External links
 

1982 births
Living people
Belgian male short track speed skaters
Olympic short track speed skaters of Belgium
Short track speed skaters at the 2002 Winter Olympics
Sportspeople from Bruges